Coleophora aequigesa is a moth of the family Coleophoridae. It is found in Mongolia and China.

References

aequigesa
Moths described in 1975
Moths of Asia